The Vumba massacre (also known as the Elim Mission massacre) was a massacre of eight British missionaries and four children committed by ZANLA guerrillas during the Rhodesian Bush War on 23 June 1978. The missionaries belonged to the Elim Pentecostal Mission based in the Vumba mountains near the Mozambican border in Rhodesia.

Events
The guerrillas separated White missionaries and their relatives from the rest of the camp and axed, battered or bayoneted them to death. Black teachers and students were told that "some White staff have been arrested" and ordered not to report the incident to the authorities. The victims included three couples, two single women, three children and a 3-week-old baby. All victims were British citizens. Four of the five women had been raped, and one woman was found with an axe in her back. Three children were discovered lying dead next to a woman in pyjamas. 

One woman who was beaten and dragged away survived after being found in a serious condition on the next day. The only White resident who avoided the attack altogether had hid himself after being warned by a Black servant.

Context and aftermath 
Since 1972, nearly 40 missionaries had been killed before the Vumba massacre, and only two days after it, two German Jesuits were killed west of Salisbury. The Vumba massacre was the single worst attack on Europeans and church representatives in Rhodesia.

The site of the massacre, the former Eagle School buildings which were used by the Elim Mission, were subsequently taken over by the ZANU–PF and used as a training camp, while access was restricted for others.

According to a 2017 The Sunday Telegraph report, government cables indicated that the British Prime Minister James Callaghan received credible information that Robert Mugabe's forces were behind the massacre, but they decided to ignore the issue to avoid disrupting the on-going peace talks.

See also 
Musami massacre, 1977 missionary killing in Rhodesia
Adolph Schmitt, Roman Catholic bishop emeritus murdered in Rhodesia
Johanna Decker, missionary murdered in Rhodesia

References

Further reading 

Ethnic cleansing in Africa
Massacres in 1978
Massacres in Rhodesia
Massacres of Christians
Racially motivated violence against white people in Africa
Rape in Africa
Rhodesian Bush War
Violence against women in Zimbabwe